The TOJ SC204 is a sports prototype race car, designed, developed and built by German racing team and constructor, Team Obermoser Jörg; constructed to the FIA's Group 6 category and specification of motor racing, specifically the European 2-Litre Sportscar Championship, in 1976. Its career spanned 3 years, and it only managed to score 2 podium finishes, with its best result being a 3rd-place finish. Like its predecessor, it was powered by a naturally-aspirated  BMW M12/7 four-cylinder engine; producing .

References

Sports prototypes
24 Hours of Le Mans race cars